Razdolye is a rural locality (a selo) in Urgushevsky Selsoviet, Karaidelsky District, Bashkortostan, Russia. The population was 237 as of 2010. There are 4 streets.

Geography 
Razdolye is located 23 km southwest of Karaidel (the district's administrative centre) by road. Urgush is the nearest rural locality.

References 

Rural localities in Karaidelsky District